Gangelt is a municipality in the district of Heinsberg, in North Rhine-Westphalia, Germany. It is on the border with the Netherlands and about 10 km east of Sittard and 10 km south-west of Heinsberg.

Its most well-known resident was cartographer Gerard Kremer, better known as Gerardus Mercator, who lived the first five or six years of his life there.

Geography

Local subdivisions

 Gangelt with 2,521 inhabitants
 Birgden with 2,977 inhabitants
 Breberen with 828 inhabitants
 Broichhoven with 168 inhabitants
 Brüxgen with 513 inhabitants
 Buscherheide with 132 inhabitants
 Harzelt with 201 inhabitants
 Hastenrath with 536 inhabitants
 Hohenbusch with 45 inhabitants
 Kievelberg with 32 inhabitants
 Kreuzrath with 504 inhabitants
 Langbroich with 807 inhabitants
 Mindergangelt with 244 inhabitants
 Nachbarheid with 120 inhabitants
 Niederbusch with 601 inhabitants
 Schierwaldenrath with 596 inhabitants
 Schümm with 93 inhabitants
 Stahe with 1,029 inhabitants
 Vinteln with 42 inhabitants
(21.02.2007)

History
Gangelt was first mentioned in a document in 828 as a King's property.

In February 2020, a carnival celebration caused a massive COVID-19 outbreak. In April 2020, one in seven residents was seropositive, in a sample of 500.

Town twinning
  Sohland an der Spree, Germany, since 1991
  Kruibeke, Belgium, since 1998
  Onderbanken, Netherlands, since 1975

Local people
 Gerardus Mercator, cartographer born 1512
 Karl-Josef Kutsch (born 1924), German physician and co-author of Großes Sängerlexikon

References

External links 

Heinsberg (district)